Dobrinya and the Dragon (Dobrynya Nikitich i Zmey Gorynych) is a Russian traditionally animated feature film directed by Ilya Maksimov, made by Melnitsa Animation Studio. It opened in Russia on March 15, 2006.

The plot is based on the mythology surrounding the title characters: Dobrynya Nikitich and Zmey Gorynych. The film contains many elements of parody and jokes about The Matrix, Star Wars, The Meeting Place Cannot Be Changed, Seventeen Moments of Spring and other famous movies.

Prince Vladimir's niece, Zabava, is kidnapped. Dobrynya Nikitich and his young apprentice, Yelisey, go to find her, discovering betrayal and treachery where least expected.

Plot
Prince of Kiev accidentally learns that his niece Zabava fell in love with a simple messenger Yelisey and intends to escape with him. Dissatisfied with this, the prince decides to send Yelisey to the assignment, and Zabava to marry. He tells Yelisey to bring the Bogatyr Dobrynya Nikitich an order - to collect a tribute from the Crimean Khan Becket. To the great displeasure of Dobrynya, the order contains a princely order to take Yelisey's helpers.

As for the prince, he tries to extradite Zabava, but she does not like any of the candidates. In the meantime, Dobrynya Nikitich collects tribute from the khan with a fight and rescues the previously taken prisoner Yelisey. At this time, the noble merchant Kolyvan comes to the prince - a master in gambling, who offers him to extradite Zabava for him, in exchange promising to forgive a large monetary debt for forty thousand. The prince reluctantly agrees, and then Kolyvan, with the help of one of his debtors, the three-headed dragon Zmey Gorynych, arranges the abduction of Zabava and hides her in her village.

Returning to Kiev, Dobrynya Nikitich and Yelisey notice that the prince and his boyars are mourning the missing princess. For Dobrynya Nikitich it becomes a shock when he finds out that the kidnapper is Zmey Gorynych, because the latter was his best friend. However, in response to Dobrynya's offer to go in search of the prince sends the protagonist on vacation, but Dobrynya Nikitich and Yelisey, disobeying the order, go to the Snake on the camel found. Meanwhile, Kolyvan declares himself the savior of Zabava and decides to marry her, but she refuses to him. Then Kolyvan takes Zabava to Kudykina mountain - to her debtor Baba-Yaga and demands that she bewitch Zabava.

Dobrynya Nikitich and Yelisey come to Zmey Gorynych, who declares that he is not involved in the kidnapping of the princess. However, the same night, experiencing the blame for Dobrynya for having spent it, Zmey Gorynych decides to return Zabava and on a camel goes in search of Kolyvan, leaving an explanatory note. But Kolyvan with the help of a hut on chicken legs overcomes Zmey Gorynych and hides him with Zabava in the closet. The camel runs away.

The next morning, Yelisey finds a note and tells Dobryne about her. The latter is very disappointed by the deceit of Zmey Gorynych, one might say, is angry. Together with Yelisey they go in search of Kolyvan. In the meantime, the prince, upon learning of Dobrynya's departure, writes a letter to Kolyvan, and he asks Baba-Yaga for the lime of the hero, but none of her spells can break the strong spirit of Dobrynya Nikitich. Then Kolyvan orders the khan Becket, who was also his debtor, to get rid of the hero. He takes prisoner Yelisey and the camel he found, but Dobrynya Nikitich rescues them and learns from the Khan that Kolyvan is hiding on Kadykina Mountain.

Zabava and Zmey Gorynych run away from the hut, but the latter can not fly and thus begins to sink in the swamp. The young Dobrynya Nikitich and Yelisey come to rescue him. Then Baba-Yaga, having caused a dark force, attacks the heroes. After a long battle, Dobrynya overcomes Yaga. Kolyvan tries to escape, but Dobrynya Nikitich catches him and suggests deciding what to do with him. While they confer, Kolyvan escapes, but he did not need them. It's enough just to destroy all the misdemeanors of the villain.

Dobrynya Nikitich, Zmey Gorynych, Yelisey and Zabava return home. On the way Gorynych, once again learned how to fly, flies away, and Dobrynya Nikitich, Yelisey and Zabava return to Kiev. The prince is very glad to see his niece, but still against her marriage to Yelisey. However, Dobrynya persuades the prince to change the decision, after which Yelisey and Zabava arrange a magnificent wedding.

Box office
The film opened at #2 in the box office in Russia and the CIS, and grossed around $3,500,000.

See also
History of Russian animation
List of animated feature films
Prince Vladimir (film)

References

External links
 
 
 Official website at the CTB Film Company 
 Dobrynya Nikitich and Zmey Gorynych at the Animator.ru

2006 films
Russian animated films
2006 animated films
2000s adventure comedy films
2000s children's comedy films
2000s fantasy comedy films
Films based on fairy tales
Films based on Russian folklore
Animated films based on Slavic mythology
Russian adventure comedy films
Russian children's fantasy films
Russian animated fantasy films
Animated adventure films
Animated comedy films
Melnitsa Animation Studio animated films
Cultural depictions of Vladimir the Great
Kievan Rus in fiction
Animated films about dragons
2000s children's animated films
2000s Russian-language films